Dutch recording artist Jan Smit has released 24 studio albums, three compilation albums, three live albums and 33 singles since 1997. Most of his albums are Dutch, but he released also a few German albums. His singles and albums have charted in Flanders, Austria, Switzerland and Germany; however, Smit is the most successful in his own country the Netherlands.

Albums

Studio albums

Dutch albums

German albums

Compilation albums

Dutch albums

German albums

Live albums

Dutch albums

Singles

As lead artist

As featured artist

Other appearances

Notes

References

Discographies of Dutch artists